Human interface guidelines (HIG) are software development documents which offer application developers a set of recommendations.  Their aim is to improve the experience for the users by making application interfaces more intuitive, learnable, and consistent.  Most guides limit themselves to defining a common look and feel for applications in a particular desktop environment.  The guides enumerate specific policies. Policies are sometimes based on studies of human–computer interaction (so called usability studies), but most are based on conventions chosen by the platform  developers preferences. 

The central aim of a HIG is to create a consistent experience across the environment (generally an operating system or desktop environment), including the applications and other tools being used. This means both applying the same visual design and creating consistent access to and behaviour of common elements of the interface – from simple ones such as buttons and icons up to more complex constructions, such as dialog boxes.

HIGs are recommendations and advice meant to help developers create better applications. Developers sometimes intentionally choose to break them if they think that the guidelines do not fit their application, or usability testing reveals an advantage in doing so.  But in turn, the organization publishing the HIG might withhold endorsement of the application.  Mozilla Firefox's user interface, for example, goes against the GNOME project's HIG, which is one of the main arguments for including GNOME Web instead of Firefox in the GNOME distribution.

Scope 
Human interface guidelines often describe the visual design rules, including icon and window design and style.  Much less frequently, they specify how user input and interaction mechanisms work.  Aside from the detailed rules, guidelines sometimes also make broader suggestions about how to organize and design the application and write user-interface text.

HIGs are also done for applications.  In this case the HIG will build on a platform HIG by adding the common semantics for a range of application functions.

Cross-platform guidelines 
In contrast to platform-specific guidelines, cross-platform guidelines aren't tied to a distinct platform. These guidelines make recommendations which should be true on any platform. Since this isn't always possible, cross-platform guidelines may weigh the compliance against the imposed work load.

Examples

Linux, macOS, Unix-like
Elementary OS Human Interface Guidelines (Old link )
GNOME Human Interface Guidelines
KDE Human Interface Guidelines
Apple Human Interface Guidelines
OLPC Human Interface Guidelines
Ubuntu App Design Guides
Xfce UI Guidelines
Motif and CDE 2.1 Style Guide
(Classic) Macintosh Human Interface Guidelines

Programming languages
Java Look and Feel Design Guidelines, and Advanced Topics (2001)

Portable devices
Android Design
Apple Watch Human Interface Guidelines
iOS Human Interface Guidelines

Microsoft Windows
Windows User Experience Interaction Guidelines (for Windows 7 and Windows Vista)
Microsoft Fluent Design System (for Windows 10-based devices)
Design library for Windows Phone

Miscellaneous
Eclipse User Interface Guidelines (2007)
wyoGuide, a cross-platform HIG (wxWidgets)
ELMER (guidelines for public forms on the internet)
Haiku Human Interface Guidelines

See also 
 User interface
 Human interface device
 Usability
 Common User Access
 Graphical user interface builder
 Linux on the desktop
 Principle of least astonishment

References

Human–computer interaction
Graphical user interfaces

de:Human Interface Guideline